Prange is a surname. Notable people with the surname include:

Ashley Prange (born 1981), American golfer
Eugene Prange (c. 1918 – 2006), American coding theorist
Gordon Prange (1910–1980), American writer
Greg Prange, American film editor
Louis H. Prange, American politician
Dori Elizabeth Prange, American Wrestler
Ulf Prange (born 1975), German lawyer and politician
Sebastian Prange, historian

See also
Littleton v. Prange